is a 2009 Japanese film directed by Takashi Shimizu.  The theme song is called "CLONE" and is performed by Straightener. The film was inspired by Fuji-Q High Land’s famous “Labyrinth of Horrors” haunted house ride, and was shot at night in the amusement park.

Synopsis
A group of teenagers must deal with the return of a friend who had been missing for a decade, and was presumed dead. After the friend, Yuki, falls ill, they take her to a hospital, only to become trapped in a terrifying labyrinth.

Cast

References

External links
 
 Review at Midnight Eye

2009 horror films
2009 films
Films directed by Takashi Shimizu
Japanese horror films
2000s Japanese films